Shaun Stafford was the defending champion, but lost in the semifinals to Wang Shi-ting.

Shi-ting won the title by defeating Linda Harvey-Wild 6–1, 7–6(7–4) in the final.

Seeds

Draw

Finals

Top half

Bottom half

References

External links
 Official results archive (ITF)

Taipei Women's Championship
Taipei Women's Championship
Taipei Women's Championship, 1994